The Cortes Españolas, known informally as the Cortes franquistas, was the name of the legislative institution promulgated by the Caudillo of Spain Francisco Franco which was established on 17 July 1942 (the sixth anniversary of the start of the Spanish Civil War), and opened its first session 20 months later on 17 March 1943. The Cortes sought to present itself as the highest organisational body for the Spanish people and to participate in the work of the State (Article 1A of the Constitutive Act of the Cortes, as amended by Act 1967 of the State in its third additional provision). Its members were known as procuradores (singular procurador), reviving a term used for legislators prior to the Napoleonic era.

The main function of the Cortes was the development and adoption of laws, but under its subsequent sanction reserved to the Head of State (Franco himself). 

To identify itself as a continuation of the Spanish parliamentary tradition, the Cortes was seated at the Palace of the Cortes, Madrid.  However, this institution had greater similarity with the corporate system of Italian Fascism. Its members supposedly represented the various elements of Spanish society. The Cortes was not intended as the repository of national sovereignty, since all sovereign power was concentrated in the head of state (Caudillo), Franco, in the absence of separation of powers. The government was not responsible to it; ministers were appointed and dismissed by Franco alone. It also had no power over government spending.

Franco himself rejected any identification with liberal democracy. Instead, he conceived his system as a solvent ideology of national unity between social classes and territories. Prosecutors were ex officio members, appointed by the Head of State or chosen from corporate entities, and until 1967 did not materialize the way of choosing a "third family" ("Third" was the conventional way of referring to the "organic" representation from "natural entities" considered the only possible channels for the expression of popular will – "family, town and union").  

Two family representatives from each region, elected by those who appear on the Electoral heads of households and married women in the manner established by the law (majority was established, with different effects depending on the family situation – for males at age 21 and for women 25 in the referendum but did have the right to vote all men and women of the Nation over twenty years).

Elections were held to cover that portion of the Deputies in the Cortes on 10 October 1967, and on 29 September 1971. In the 1971 election, the last in Franco's lifetime, there were 230 candidates were on the ballot for the 104 popularly-elected seats, representing one-fifth of the Cortes, and the other four-fifths were "designated, directly or indirectly, by the authorities."

Presidents

References

See also
 Cortes Generales
 Fundamental Laws of the Realm
 List of presidents of the Congress of Deputies of Spain

Francoist Spain
Spain
Spain
Defunct unicameral legislatures
Spain
1942 establishments in Spain
1977 disestablishments in Spain